Pure as a Lily is a 1976 Italian comedy film directed by Franco Rossi and starring Vittorio Gassman.

Cast
 Vittorio Gassman - Anthony M. Wilson
 Ornella Muti - Lucia Mantuso
 Madeleine Hinde - Vanessa Hampton
 Adolfo Celi - L'onorevole
 Alessandro Haber - Vittorio
 Armando Bandini - Sandro Scibetta
 Antonino Faa Di Bruno - Don Gerlando
 Graham Stark - Detective Mike
 Dudley Sutton - Jack
 Lou Castel - Luciano
 John Bryant - Basil
 Stan Jay - Anthony's Father
 Malya Woolf - Polimena
 Michael Da Costa - Giulio
 Guido Adorni - Waiter
 Tony Osoba - Othello

References

External links

Pure as a Lily at Variety Distribution

1976 films
1976 comedy films
Italian comedy films
1970s Italian-language films
Films directed by Franco Rossi
Films scored by John Cameron
1970s Italian films